The Happy Wanderer is a 1955 West German romantic comedy film directed by Hans Quest. It stars Rudolf Schock, Waltraut Haas, Elma Karlowa, and Willy Fritsch. It was shot in Agfacolor at the Tempelhof Studios in West Berlin and on location in Bavaria. The film's sets were designed by the art director Hans Kuhnert.

It is more than just a romantic comedy, but also is a Heimatfilm and references the Wandervogel movement and thus deals with modernization as a movement and its resonance on the culture where the film is set.

Cast

References

Bibliography
 Bock, Hans-Michael & Bergfelder, Tim. The Concise CineGraph. Encyclopedia of German Cinema. Berghahn Books, 2009.

External links
 

West German films
1955 films
1950s German-language films
German musical comedy films
1955 musical comedy films
Films directed by Hans Quest
Films about singers
1955 romantic comedy films
German romantic musical films
1950s romantic musical films
1950s German films
Films shot at Tempelhof Studios
Films shot in Bavaria